is a 2000 Japanese Pink film directed by Tarō Araki. It was chosen as Best Film of the year at the Pink Grand Prix ceremony. Tomohiro Okada was given the Best Actor award and cinematographer Shōji Shimizu was also awarded for his work on the film at the ceremony.

Writer-actress, Yumi Yoshiyuki wrote and directed a sequel to the film released in July of the same year, . Yoshiyuki starred in the sequel which included AV idol Yumika Hayashi.

Cast
 Emi Kawana
 Yumi Yoshiyuki
 Ayumu Tokitō
 Tomohiro Okada
 Kenichirō Tajima
Korii Sumisu
 Tarō Araki

Bibliography

References

2000 films
2000s erotic films
Films directed by Tarō Araki
2000s Japanese-language films
OP Eiga films
Pink films
2000s pornographic films
2000s Japanese films